The 2004 Maryland Democratic presidential primary took place on March 2, 2004 as part of the 2004 Democratic Party presidential primaries. The delegate allocation is proportional; candidates are awarded delegates in proportion to the percentage of votes received, open to registered Democrats only. Frontrunner John Kerry won the primary with former Senator John Edwards coming in a distant second.

Results
Primary date: March 2, 2004

See also
 2004 Democratic Party presidential primaries

References

Maryland
2004 Maryland elections
2004